This is a list of regions of the Dominican Republic by Human Development Index as of 2023.

References 

Dominican Republic
Human Development Index
Regions of the Dominican Republic by Human Development Index